The Seminole killifish (Fundulus seminolis) is a fish of the genus Fundulus, endemic to the U.S. state of Florida.

Geographic distribution
The Seminole killifish ranges throughout much of peninsular Florida from the St. Johns and New river drainages south to the Everglades.

Biology
The Seminole killifish occurs in the open areas of lakes and quiet pools in streams. The juveniles are usually encountered in schools in the vicinity vegetation.

Taxonomy and name
Fundulus seminolis was described by Charles Frédéric Girard in 1859 with the type locality given as Palatka in eastern Florida. The specific name probably alludes to the Seminole people who are indigenous to southern Florida where this species is endemic.

Gallery

References 

Fundulus
Endemic fauna of Florida
Freshwater fish of the Southeastern United States
Least concern biota of the United States
Fish described in 1859